Nasakia is a genus of Naukatid brachiopod known from Cambrian strata. There is a species called Nasakia thulensis.

References

Brachiopod taxonomy
Cambrian Greenland